Brigadier-General Roland Boys Bradford, VC, MC (23 February 1892 – 30 November 1917) was a British Army officer and an English recipient of the Victoria Cross, the highest award for gallantry in the face of the enemy that can be awarded to British and Commonwealth forces. His elder brother, Lieutenant Commander George Bradford, was also awarded the Victoria Cross, making them the only pair of brothers to be awarded the medal during the First World War.

Early life
Bradford was born on 23 February 1892 at Witton Park to George Bradford. and educated at Epsom College in Surrey. He had three brothers, James Barker, Thomas Andrews and George Nicholson.

Military service
Bradford was commissioned into the 5th Battalion, Durham Light Infantry (a Territorial Force unit) in 1910. He transferred to the Regular Army in 1912, joining his regiment's 2nd Battalion with the rank of second lieutenant. He was a lieutenant by the outbreak of the First World War in 1914.

On 1 October 1916, Bradford, now a temporary lieutenant colonel commanding the 9th Battalion, Durham Light Infantry, was awarded the Victoria Cross (VC) for his actions at Eaucourt L'Abbaye, France. His citation for the award was published in the London Gazette on 25 November, reading:

Promotion and death
On 13 November 1917, at the age of 25, he was promoted to the rank of brigadier general; he was the youngest general officer in the British Army of modern times (and the youngest promoted professionally, earlier young generals were simply due to position). He was killed in action at Cambrai, France, seventeen days later, on 30 November 1917.

All three of Bradford's brothers also served in the First World War. Two, Lieutenant Commander George Bradford of the Royal Navy and Second Lieutenant James Barker Bradford of the Durham Light Infantry, died in service. George and Roland were the only pair of brothers to win the VC in the First World War. His third brother, Colonel Sir Thomas Bradford, became honorary treasurer of Durham University and High Sheriff of County Durham in 1941.

Legacy
Bradford's Victoria Cross and Military Cross are currently on loan to the University of Durham and are held at Palace Green Library adjacent to Durham Cathedral in Durham, England. Medals are not on display, but members of the public are able to consult individual medals or groups of medals from the collection in the Barker Research Library within Palace Green Library.

A memorial garden and statue to Bradford was unveiled in 2017. The British government commemorated the centenary of the First World War by installing an inscribed stone at the recipient's birthplace. Local councillors from Bradford's birthplace at Witton Park decided to use this occasion to create a memorial garden at the site with help from the Heritage Lottery Fund, Groundwork North-East and Durham County Council. A metal statue by Ray Lonsdale called The Ball was installed as part of the memorial garden. This depicts a soldier returning home from the front together with a pitman who is comforting him and passing a football to him representing giving him back his old life before the war.

References

Further reading
The Fighting Bradfords (Harry Moses, County Durham Books, 2003)
Brigadier-General R B Bradford VC MC and His Brothers (C Turley-Smith and Major T Welch MC, Ray Westlake)

External links

1892 births
1917 deaths
British Army generals of World War I
British Battle of the Somme recipients of the Victoria Cross
British military personnel killed in World War I
People educated at Epsom College
Recipients of the Military Cross
People from Witton Park
Durham Light Infantry officers
British Army recipients of the Victoria Cross
British Army brigadiers
Military personnel from County Durham
Burials in France